Texada/Gillies Bay Airport  is located  northwest of Gillies Bay, Texada Island, British Columbia, Canada.

Airlines and destinations
The airport has had no scheduled flights since KD Air ceased operations in 2019.

See also
 List of airports in the Gulf Islands

References

External links

Official site

Certified airports in British Columbia
Qathet Regional District
Texada Island
Airports in the Gulf Islands